The Trade Agreements Act of 1979 (TAA), codified at , is an Act of Congress that governs trade agreements negotiated between the United States and other countries under the Trade Act of 1974.  It provided the implementing legislation for the Tokyo Round of the General Agreement on Tariffs and Trade.

The stated purposes of the TAA are:
 Approve and implement the trade agreements negotiated under the Trade Act of 1974
 Foster the growth and maintenance of an open world trading system
 Expand opportunities for the commerce of the United States in international trade
 Improve the rules of international trade and to provide for the enforcement of such rules, and for other purposes

The TAA can restrict procurement of goods and services for federal contracts, if the program management office decides to check TAA compliance. In many ways the TAA supersedes the Buy American Act, because the TAA allows the President to waive the Buy American Act under certain conditions. Federal Acquisition Regulations (FAR) Subpart 25.4 includes guidance for TAA compliance. In general, a product is TAA compliant if it is made in the United States or a "Designated Country". Designated Countries include:
 Those with a free trade agreement with the United States such as Canada, Mexico, Australia, and Singapore
 Countries that participate in the World Trade Organization Government Procurement Agreement (WTO GPA), including Japan and many countries in Europe
 Least developed countries such as Afghanistan, Bangladesh, Laos, and Ethiopia
 Caribbean Basin countries such as Aruba, Costa Rica, and Haiti

Notably absent from the list is the People's Republic of China. A full list of Designated Countries is in FAR 25.003.

References

External links
 Federal Acquisition Regulations, Part 25 - Foreign Acquisition

1979 in American law
Foreign trade of the United States
United States federal trade legislation
1979 in international relations
July 1979 events in the United States